Othman Saadi (1930 – 30 November 2022) was an Algerian writer, diplomat, and politician.

Biography
Saadi joined the Algerian People's Party and later the National Liberation Front (FLN). He dropped out of French school after the Sétif and Guelma massacre. He graduated from the Institut Abdelhamid Ben Badis in Constantine in 1951 and subsequently earned a licentiate from Cairo University in 1956, a master's degree from the University of Baghdad in 1979, and a doctorate from Algiers 1 University in 1986.

Following his work for the National Liberation Army in Cairo, Saadi became head of Algeria's diplomatic mission in Kuwait and was subsequently chargé d'affaires in Cairo from 1968 to 1971. He then worked as a diplomat in Baghdad from 1971 to 1974 and in Damascus from 1974 to 1977.

Saadi was elected to the People's National Assembly in 1977 from the constituency of Tébessa as a member of the FLN. He served until 1982.

Othman Saadi died in Algiers on 30 November 2022.

References

1930 births
2022 deaths
Algerian writers
Members of the People's National Assembly
Ambassadors of Algeria to Iraq
Ambassadors of Algeria to Syria
Members of the National Liberation Front (Algeria)
University of Baghdad alumni
Cairo University alumni
University of Algiers alumni
20th-century Algerian politicians
People from Tébessa